The CBF Rankings are football rankings produced by the CBF, the Brazilian Football Confederation.  The Ranking Nacional de Federações determines how many berths each state federation receives in Copa do Brasil, Campeonato Brasileiro Série D, Copa do Nordeste and Copa Verde. The Ranking Nacional de Clubes is a ranking of clubs and is used to determine the extra participants of Copa do Brasil as well as the allocation of clubs in the pots for the draws of Copa do Brasil and Copa do Nordeste.

Criteria for awarding points
Points are awarded to clubs on the basis of performances in various competitions.

Points for Campeonato Brasileiro 

Série A

Série B

Série C

Série D

Note: For 2020 and 2021 only, the teams eliminated in the Pré-Série D (65th through 68th places) received 10 points. The 65th through 68th places in other years also received 51 points.

Points for Copa do Brasil

Points for participants of Copa Libertadores up to 2012 

Note: Up to 2012 clubs taking part of Copa Libertadores could not participate of Copa do Brasil of the same year.

Points for the champion of Copa Sudamericana up to 2016 

Note: Up to 2016 The Copa Sudamericana champions automatically qualifies to the next year edition of the competition, being unable to take part of the next edition of Copa do Brasil.

2023 Club Ranking
Last update: 18 November 2022

2023 State Ranking
Last update:18 November 2022

2023 Women's Club Ranking
Last update: 7 December 2022

2023 Women's State Ranking
Last update:5 December 2022

References

Football in Brazil
Brazilian Football Confederation
Association football rankings